Bulimulus duncanus is a species of  tropical air-breathing land snail, a pulmonate gastropod mollusk in the subfamily Bulimulinae.

This species is endemic to Ecuador.  Its natural habitat is subtropical or tropical dry forests.

References

Bulimulus
Endemic gastropods of the Galápagos Islands
Gastropods described in 1893
Taxonomy articles created by Polbot